Matthew Chozick is an American actor, writer, filmmaker, scholar, and television personality (tarento) in Japan.

Career 
Since April 2012, Chozick has starred weekly with Takeshi Kitano on Nippon TV's Sekai marumie! Terebi tokusôbu, one of Japan's most popular comedy-variety shows. In addition to TV work, Chozick is known for acting in the film Love and Other Cults (2017), for co-hosting a popular show on NHK Radio, and for his writing in Japanese and English. He also teaches at Temple University Japan Campus and has lectured at other universities in the US, UK, and Japan. 

Chozick's directorial debut, Toshie the Nihilist, garnered numerous awards after premiering at the Academy Award and BAFTA qualifying LA Shorts International Film Festival in 2021. That same year, Chozick also appeared in Sion Sono's Prisoners of the Ghostland, which premiered at Sundance Film Festival.

Aside from media work and teaching, Chozick publishes academic research in the fields of comparative literature, cultural studies, and translation theory. He has also edited, written, and translated several books. Chozick earned a PhD in the UK at the University of Birmingham and studied method acting in Los Angeles at the Lee Strasberg Theatre and Film Institute. He has also trained in New York at the Barrow Group.

Filmography

Select Films

Select Television

Awards and nominations

References

External links 
 Official Website

1980 births
Living people
American actors
American writers
Expatriate television personalities in Japan